University of Mkar, Mkar is a private Christian institution established by the Church of Christ in Sudan among the Tiv (NKST) to make a mark in the educational landscape of the nation. Founded in June, 2005, it is a model University that is technologically driven, has strong passion for academic excellence, emphasises character development and puts God at the centre of all learning.

Location
University of Mkar is located in Mkar Benue State, Nigeria. It was formerly called Hilltop University. It is a Christian University.

See also 
 Academic libraries in Nigeria

References

External links
About the University of Mkar

Graduates of mkar university. 
igirgi Ngumimi Stephanie (sociology class 2019). IGI

Universities and colleges in Nigeria
Education in Benue State
Educational institutions established in 2005
2005 establishments in Nigeria
Christian universities and colleges in Nigeria